The Vice President of the Supreme Court is the second highest authority of the Supreme Court of Spain and its main duty is to support and replace the President as head of the Court. The vice president is appointed by the Monarch after being nominated by the General Council of the Judiciary at the proposal of the president of the council. It has a term of five years.

As the second authority and the main assistant to the president, the legislation established that the vice president is the person responsible for replacing the president in cases of vacancy, absence, illness or other legitimate reasons. The office of vice president was created in 2013 and it must not to be confused with the Vice President of the General Council of the Judiciary. The office of Vice President of the Supreme Court was created to replace the CGPJ Vice Presidency. Likewise, the president may delegate in the vice president the superior direction of the Technical Office of the Supreme Court, as well as other functions, but always for a justified reason.

The vice president, due to the fact of being it, is a born member of the Governing Chamber of the Supreme Court and it is responsible for proposing to the Chamber and to the president the adoption of those decisions aimed at guaranteeing the correct functioning of the Supreme Court, as well as ensuring the exact execution of the agreements adopted by the Governing Chamber.

Currently, the office of Vice President of the Supreme Court is vacant after the retirement of the first and only vice president, Ángel Juanes Peces. Due to the impossibility of a new appointment, the CGPJ has distributed the powers of the vice president between the magistrate Ángel Calderón, who assumes the functions related to the vice presidency of the Supreme Court (as the senior chamber chair), and the member of the CGPJ, Rafael Fernández Valverde, who assumes the functions related to the CGPJ. Ángel Calderón retired on June 12, 2020 and Jesús Gullón assumed the interim vice presidency. He retired on June 25, assuming the office Francisco Marín Castán.

History

Origin 
The office of Vice President of the Supreme Court was created in 2013 to replace the office of Vice President of the General Council of the Judiciary. According to the 2013 law that created it, "the existence of a Vice President is particularly important to the Supreme Court, due to that in the last thirty years the CGPJ has almost completely absorbed the time of the successive Presidents, de facto depriving the former of a unitary presidency". That is to say, the office of Vice President of the CGPJ was useless because the Council occupied most of the time of the president and the vice president had no duties. Moreover, the Supreme Court remained on numerous occasions without his head.

Vice President of the CGPJ 
Like said before, the office of Vice President of the Supreme Court must not to be confused with the office of Vice President of the GCPJ, and the current Supreme Court' Vice President is never the Vice President of the GCPJ. The president, however, it is. The office of GCPJ Vice President existed from 1985 to 2013. Its main task was to replace the president of the council and it was appointed by the Monarch at the request of the CGPJ by a majority of three fifths.

From its creation to its suppression, six people held the position of Vice President of the CGPJ:

 Adolfo Carretero Pérez (1985)
 Manuel Peris Gómez (1985–1990)
 José Luis Manzanares Samaniego (1990–1996)
 Luis López Guerra (1996–2001)
 Fernando Salinas Molina (2001–2008)
 Fernando de Rosa Torner (2008–2014)

First holder and vacancy 
The first holder of the office was appointed by the Plenary of the General Council of the Judiciary in January 2014. Supreme Court' President Carlos Lesmes nominated Ángel Juanes Peces, a magistrates that was serving as President of the National Court since 2009 and before as member of the Military Chamber of the Supreme Court from 2005 to 2009. The 5-years-term of Juanes was expected to end in January 2019 but because of the impossibility of renew the General Council of the Judiciary because of the parliament deadlock, the Plenary of the Council agreed to extend his term until October 2019, when Juanes reached the mandatory retirement age.

In October 2019, the President of the Supreme Court approved the mandatory retirement of Juanes and he temporary divided the powers of the office between two positions: the Chair of the Military Chamber, Ángel Calderón, and the magistrate and member of the CGPJ, Rafael Fernández Valverde. The first one assumed the powers related with the Supreme Court, while the second one assumed the powers related with the council.

Appointment 
According to the Organic Act of the Judiciary of 1985, amended in 2013 to include the figure of the vice president, the vice president will be elected in the first ordinary Plenary meeting of the General Council of the Judiciary (CGPJ). To be appointed vice president, the Plenary must approve the candidate chosen by the President of the Supreme Court by absolute majority. If this majority is not reached, the president must propose another candidate.

In order to be a candidate, the candidate must have the status of Magistrate of the Supreme Court, be on active duty and meet the requirements to be President of a Supreme Court Chamber. The application must be public and communicated to the members of the CGPJ one week in advance.

Dismissal 
In accordance with Section 589 of the Organic Act of the Judiciary, apart from the end of the term of office, the vice president may be dismissed by the Plenary of the council with a justified reason if approved by three fifths of it.

List of vice presidents 
Since 2013, only one person has held the office:

References 

Judiciary of Spain
Lists of Spanish judges